is a railway station on the Kominato Line in Ichihara, Chiba Prefecture, Japan, operated by the private railway operator Kominato Railway.

Lines
Kazusa-Mitsumata Station is served by the Kominato Line, and lies 7.2 km from the western terminus of the line at Goi Station.

Station layout
Kazusa-Mitsumata Station has one side platform serving a single bidirectional line.

Adjacent stations

History
Kazusa-Mitsumata Station was opened on November 20, 1932. The original station building burned down in February 2001 and was replaced with a wooden structure. The station has been unattended since 1956.

Passenger statistics
In fiscal 2010, the station was used by an average of 143 passengers daily (boarding passengers only).

See also
 List of railway stations in Japan

References

External links

  

Railway stations in Japan opened in 1932
Railway stations in Chiba Prefecture
Kominato Line